FanDuel TV (formerly TVG) is an American sports-oriented digital cable and satellite television network owned by FanDuel Group, the U.S. subsidiary of Irish bookmaker Flutter Entertainment. 

The network was originally established as

Formerly known as TVG and specializing in coverage of live horse racing, the network was rebranded as FanDuel TV in September 2022. Post-rebrand, the intent is to focus on mainstream sports and sports betting while retaining the TVG name for online horse wagering.

History

TVG (1999–2022) 

FanDuel TV was launched on July 14, 1999 as TVG (short for Television Games Network), and was founded as a joint-venture of TV Guide Inc. (which at the time was owned by both Liberty Media and News Corp.), National Thoroughbred Racing Association, and AT&T Broadband.

In May 2006, TVG introduced several new programs to its schedule including Morning Line, Fandicapping, :58 Flat, Lady Luck (an all-female panel discussion program focusing on the day's races) and Drive Time (which covered exclusive racing from the Meadowlands). TVG places microphones on select jockeys, owners, trainers, and the starting crew.

The channel formerly operated a fictional betting site, TVGfree.net, which allowed it to have a presence in the fifteen states which prohibit televised and off track betting, operating similarly to poker sites which use the .net domain to differentiate their fictional betting sites from the .com sites which allow gambling. The site was discontinued at the start of 2012 due to a site upgrade, and currently redirects to TVG.com.

In the end of February 2007, TVG ended its longtime affiliation with Churchill Downs Incorporated. On May 2, 2008, Gemstar-TV Guide was acquired by Macrovision (now TiVo Corporation) for $2.8 billion.

Macrovision, which purchased Gemstar-TV Guide to boost the value of VCR Plus+ and electronic program guide patents, later stated that it was considering a sale of TVG, TV Guide Network, and the TV Guide print edition's namesake to other parties.

In the end of 2008, Macrovision sold TVG to British bookmaker Betfair for $50 million. The deal was completed on January 27, 2009, separating the channel from the company which acquired its founding owner in 2007. In February 2015, Betfair acquired TVG's sole competitor, HRTV, and began to consolidate it into TVG's facilities. The network was re branded as a sister network, TVG2, in October 2015.

In July 2018, the network announced that it was developing studio programs dedicated to sports betting. The U.S. Supreme Court had recently struck down the Professional and Amateur Sports Protection Act of 1992, making it legal for states outside of Delaware, Oregon, Montana, and Nevada to allow sports betting. Paddy Power Betfair had also recently acquired the daily fantasy sports service FanDuel with an intent to use it as its main U.S. subsidiary. On September 9, 2018, coinciding with the 2018 NFL season, TVG Network premiered the new Sunday morning programs The Barstool Sports Advisors and More Ways to Win.

The network saw an increase in prominence during the COVID-19 pandemic, as the shutdown of nearly all other live sports prompted increased interest in horse racing and off-track betting from tracks that remain active. The limited tracks available resulted in greater prominence given to smaller tracks and meets such as Nebraska's Fonner Park and Oklahoma's Will Rogers Downs, and the network's personalities made efforts to accommodate new viewers and explain the technical terminology associated with horse racing and wagers. TVG also reached an agreement with the mainstream sports channel NBCSN (which reaches at least 80 million homes, as opposed to TVG's 45 million) to simulcast a block of Trackside Live on Friday, Saturday, and Sunday afternoons.

FanDuel TV (2022–present) 
In July 2022, it was reported that FanDuel was considering a relaunch of TVG Network as FanDuel TV as early as September 2022, building upon More Ways to Win by adding a morning block of sports talk shows, as well as sports news segments interspersed throughout its live racing block. Such a service would compete primarily against VSiN, which was recently acquired by FanDuel's main U.S. competitor DraftKings.

FanDuel officially announced the planned relaunch on August 25, 2022; it added a live, weekday program featuring former NFL Network host Kay Adams, and announced plans for shows developed by Pat McAfee's PMI Network, and a content deal with The Ringer. The network also expanded its live sports programming into international basketball via an agreement with Sportradar, adding coverage of Australia's National Basketball League, the Chinese Basketball Association, the LNB in France, and Germany's Basketball Bundesliga. The rebranding was completed in September 2022, with TVG renamed FanDuel TV and TVG2 renamed FanDuel Racing.

Wagering services
FanDuel offers wagering services under the TVG name to residents of Arizona, Arkansas, California, Colorado, Connecticut, Delaware, Florida, Idaho, Illinois, Indiana, Iowa, Kentucky, Louisiana, Maryland, Massachusetts, Michigan, Minnesota, Montana, New Hampshire, New Jersey (under 4NJBets), New Mexico, New York, North Dakota, Ohio, Oregon, Pennsylvania, Rhode Island, South Dakota, Vermont, Virginia, Washington, West Virginia and Wyoming. Account holders are able to wager online at TVG.com, and by landline or mobile phone.

Programming
FanDuel TV covers over one hundred tracks, with exclusive coverage of several tracks, including North American tracks such as Woodbine Race Course, Keeneland Race Course, Del Mar Racetrack, Meadowlands, and Monmouth Park. The network also broadcasts races from various tracks in Argentina, Australia, Austria, Denmark, Finland, France, Germany, Hong Kong, India, Ireland, Japan, Norway, New Zealand, Saudi Arabia, Singapore, South Africa, South Korea, Sweden, United Arab Emirates, United Kingdom.

Coverage includes events such as the Travers Stakes, Haskell Invitational, Pacific Classic, Hollywood Gold Cup, Blue Grass Stakes, Wood Memorial, Melbourne Cup, Japan Cup, and the All American Futurity.

Current programming
The blanket title Live Racing is currently used for FanDuel TV's coverage of horse racing, replacing Trackside Live and other blocks. Its sub-blocks include East Coast, Coast to Coast, West Coast, Night Cap, and International.

The channel's current studio programs include

 Up & Adams, a weekday morning sports talk program hosted by Kay Adams.
 Run it Back, an NBA-focused program aired on Monday, Tuesday, and Wednesday mornings, hosted by Michelle Beadle, Chandler Parsons, and Shams Charania.
 More Ways to Win, a Sunday morning studio program aired during the NFL season featuring sports coverage from a betting perspective, hosted by Lisa Kerney.
 The Barstool Sports Advisors, a Sunday morning program aired during the NFL season featuring personalities from the website Barstool Sports, including David Portnoy, Dan Katz, PFT Commenter (Pardon My Take), and Stu Feiner. The program is divided into two half-hour blocks, with the first streamed on Barstool's own digital outlets, and the second exclusive to TVG.

On-air talent
Commentators
 Adam McGrath
Tom Amoss
 Andie Biancone
 Christina Blacker
 Simon Bray
 Caton Bredar
 Donna Barton Brothers
 Matt Carothers
 Tom Cassidy
 Britney Eurton
 Gabby Gaudet
 Scott Hazelton
 Nick Hines
 Kurt Hoover
 Joaquin Jaime
 Mike Joyce
 Caleb Keller
Lisa Kerney
 Peter Lurie
Jorge Ortuzar
 Rich Perloff
 Ken Rudulph
 Todd Schrupp
 Dave Weaver

References

External links 
 

Television channels and stations established in 1999
Companies based in Hillsboro, Oregon
English-language television stations in the United States
Sports television networks in the United States
Television networks in the United States
Horse racing mass media
Online gambling companies of the United States
1999 establishments in the United States